Adams School may refer to:

 Adams School (Phoenix, Arizona), listed on the National Register of Historic Places (NRHP) in Maricopa County, Arizona
 Adams School (Findlay, Ohio), NRHP-listed
Haberdashers' Adams, grammar school in Newport, Shropshire, England
John Adams School, in Weymouth, Massachusetts, NRHP-listed
Adams School (Amanzimtoti), a Amanzimtoti school near Durban that John Dube attended

See also
Adams High School (disambiguation)